Robert Carr (born 1956) is credited as the architect of GO Corporation's PenPoint OS. He subsequently served as Vice President of the AutoCAD Market Group at Autodesk, Inc., where he led Internet work, managed 330 staff and was responsible for its flagship product, AutoCAD. He also created the Framework integrated office suite.

References

Further reading

 Susan Lammers: Programmers at Work - Interviews, Microsoft Press 1986. In depth interviews with PC Software pioneers including Dan Bricklin, Robert Carr, Bill Gates and Andy Hertzfeld.
 Robert Carr, Dan Shafer: The Power of PenPoint, Addison-Wesley 1991. Outlines a vision for pen computing and provides a detailed description of the unique user interface and architecture of the PenPoint operating system.
Tapping the SaaS Potential
Interview of Robert Carr about framework
 Robert's current startup, Keep and Share

Stanford University alumni
American software engineers
1956 births
Living people
Scientists at PARC (company)